Periklis Rallis (1891 – August 20, 1945) was a Greek People's Party politician. He was three times Minister of the Interior of Greece, twice under the Second Hellenic Republic and once after the restoration of the monarchy in 1935.

References
Rulers.org

1891 births
1945 deaths
People's Party (Greece) politicians
Ministers of the Interior of Greece